Clearwater Lake is a reservoir on the Black River,  from Piedmont, Missouri. The U.S. Army Corps of Engineers uses Clearwater for flood control in the White and lower Mississippi River Basins.

Clearwater Lake was so named on account of its clear, spring-fed water. Construction began in 1940 but was halted temporarily at the advent of World War II.

Though recreation was not part of the lake's initial mission, Clearwater now offers boating, swimming, and camping facilities.

See also
Arkansas Game and Fish Commission v. United States, 568 U.S. ___ (2012), a decision by the Supreme Court of the United States regarding whether the federal government could be liable for property damage caused by the release of flood waters from Clearwater Dam.

References

External links

Clearwater Lake Association

Reservoirs in Missouri
Protected areas of Reynolds County, Missouri
Protected areas of Wayne County, Missouri
Buildings and structures in Reynolds County, Missouri
Buildings and structures in Wayne County, Missouri
Dams in Missouri
United States Army Corps of Engineers dams
Bodies of water of Reynolds County, Missouri
Bodies of water of Wayne County, Missouri
Black River (Arkansas–Missouri)